Pamela Neary (born March 16, 1955) is an American politician and community activist.

Neary received her bachelor's degree from Fort Lewis College in biology and political science and her master's degree in public affairs from the Humphrey School of Public Affairs. She moved from Colorado to Minnesota with her husband and family and settled in Afton, Minnesota. Neary worked for the Minnesota Office of the Legislative Auditor and was a program evaluator. She was also a community activist and substitute teacher. Neary served in the Minnesota House of Representatives in 1993 and 1994 and was a Democrat.

References

1955 births
Living people
People from Washington County, Minnesota
Fort Lewis College alumni
Humphrey School of Public Affairs alumni
Women state legislators in Minnesota
Democratic Party members of the Minnesota House of Representatives